Noise pollution, or sound pollution, is the propagation of noise or sound with ranging impacts on the activity of human or animal life, most of which are harmful to a degree. The source of outdoor noise worldwide is mainly caused by machines, transport, and propagation systems. Poor urban planning may give rise to noise disintegration or pollution, side-by-side industrial and residential buildings can result in noise pollution in the residential areas. Some of the main sources of noise in residential areas include loud music, transportation (traffic, rail, airplanes, etc.), lawn care maintenance, construction, electrical generators, wind turbines, explosions, and people.

Documented problems associated with noise in urban environments go back as far as ancient Rome. Research suggests that noise pollution in the United States is the highest in low-income and racial minority neighborhoods, and noise pollution associated with household electricity generators is an emerging environmental degradation in many developing nations.

High noise levels can contribute to cardiovascular effects in humans and an increased incidence of coronary artery disease. In animals, noise can increase the risk of death by altering predator or prey detection and avoidance, interfere with reproduction and navigation, and contribute to permanent hearing loss. A substantial amount of the noise that humans produce occurs in the ocean. Up until recently, most research on noise impacts has been focused on marine mammals, and to a lesser degree, fish. In the past few years, scientists have shifted to conducting studies on invertebrates and their responses to anthropogenic sounds in the marine environment. This research is essential, especially considering that invertebrates make up 75% of marine species, and thus compose a large percentage of ocean food webs. Of the studies that have been conducted, a sizable variety in families of invertebrates have been represented in the research. A variation in the complexity of their sensory systems exists, which allows scientists to study a range of characteristics and develop a better understanding of anthropogenic noise impacts on living organisms.

Because the local civic noise environment can impact the perceived value of real estate, often the largest equity held by a home owner, personal stakes in the noise environment and the civic politics surrounding the noise environment can run extremely high.

Noise pollution effect on Health

Humans

Noise pollution affects both health and behavior. Unwanted sound (noise) can damage physiological health. Noise pollution is associated with several health conditions, including cardiovascular disorders, hypertension, high stress levels, tinnitus, hearing loss, sleep disturbances, and other harmful and disturbing effects. According to a 2019 review of the existing literature, noise pollution was associated with faster cognitive decline.

Across Europe, according to the European Environment Agency, it estimated 113 million people are affected by road traffic noise levels above 55 decibels, the threshold at which noise becomes harmful to human health by the WHO's definition.

Sound becomes unwanted when it either interferes with normal activities such as sleep or conversation, or disrupts or diminishes one's quality of life. Noise-induced hearing loss can be caused by prolonged exposure to noise levels above 85 A-weighted decibels. A comparison of Maaban tribesmen, who were insignificantly exposed to transportation or industrial noise, to a typical U.S. population showed that chronic exposure to moderately high levels of environmental noise contributes to hearing loss.

Noise exposure in the workplace can also contribute to noise-induced hearing loss and other health issues. Occupational hearing loss is one of the most common work-related illnesses in the U.S. and worldwide.

It is less clear how humans adapt to noise subjectively. Tolerance for noise is frequently independent of decibel levels. Murray Schafer's soundscape research was groundbreaking in this regard. In his work, he makes compelling arguments about how humans relate to noise on a subjective level, and how such subjectivity is conditioned by culture. Schafer notes that sound is an expression of power, and as such, material culture (e.g., fast cars or Harley Davidson motorcycles with aftermarket pipes) tend to have louder engines not only for safety reasons, but for expressions of power by dominating the soundscape with a particular sound. 

Other key research in this area can be seen in Fong's comparative analysis of soundscape differences between Bangkok, Thailand and Los Angeles, California, US. Based on Schafer's research, Fong's study showed how soundscapes differ based on the level of urban development in the area. He found that cities in the periphery have different soundscapes than inner city areas. Fong's findings tie not only soundscape appreciation to subjective views of sound, but also demonstrates how different sounds of the soundscape are indicative of class differences in urban environments.

Noise pollution can have negative affects on adults and children on the autistic spectrum. Those with Autism Spectrum Disorder (ASD) can have hyperacusis, which is an abnormal sensitivity to sound. People with ASD who experience hyperacusis may have unpleasant emotions, such as fear and anxiety, and uncomfortable physical sensations in noisy environments with loud sounds. This can cause individuals with ASD to avoid environments with noise pollution, which in turn can result in isolation and negatively affect their quality of life. Sudden explosive noises typical of high-performance car exhausts and car alarms are types of noise pollution that can affect people with ASD.

While the elderly may have cardiac problems due to noise, according to the World Health Organization, children are especially vulnerable to noise, and the effects that noise has on children may be permanent. Noise poses a serious threat to a child's physical and psychological health, and may negatively interfere with a child's learning and behavior. Exposure to persistent noise pollution shows how important maintaining environmental health is in keeping children and elderly healthy.

Wildlife
For many marine organisms, sound is the primary means of learning about their environments. For example, many species of marine mammals and fish use sound as their primary means of navigating, communicating, and foraging. Anthropogenic noise can have a detrimental effect on animals, increasing the risk of death by changing the delicate balance in predator or prey detection and avoidance, and interfering with the use of the sounds in communication, especially in relation to reproduction, and in navigation and echolocation. These effects then may alter more interactions within a community through indirect ("domino") effects. Acoustic overexposure can lead to temporary or permanent loss of hearing.

European robins living in urban environments are more likely to sing at night in places with high levels of noise pollution during the day, suggesting that they sing at night because it is quieter, and their message can propagate through the environment more clearly. The same study showed that daytime noise was a stronger predictor of nocturnal singing than night-time light pollution, to which the phenomenon often is attributed. Anthropogenic noise reduced the species richness of birds found in Neotropical urban parks.

Zebra finches become less faithful to their partners when exposed to traffic noise. This could alter a population's evolutionary trajectory by selecting traits, sapping resources normally devoted to other activities and thus leading to profound genetic and evolutionary consequences.

Underwater noise pollution due to human activities is also prevalent in the sea, and given that sound travels faster through water than through air, is a major source of disruption of marine ecosystems and does significant harm to sea life, including marine mammals, fish and invertebrates. The once-calm sea environment is now noisy and chaotic due to ships, oil drilling, sonar equipment, and seismic testing. The principal anthropogenic noise sources come from merchant ships, naval sonar operations, underwater explosions (nuclear), and seismic exploration by oil and gas industries. 

Cargo ships generate high levels of noise due to propellers and diesel engines. This noise pollution significantly raises the low-frequency ambient noise levels above those caused by wind.  Animals such as whales that depend on sound for communication can be affected by this noise in various ways. Higher ambient noise levels also cause animals to vocalize more loudly, which is called the Lombard effect. Researchers have found that humpback whales' song lengths were longer when low-frequency sonar was active nearby.

Underwater noise pollution is not only limited to oceans, and can occur in freshwater environments as well. Noise pollution has been detected in the Yangzte River, and has resulted in the endangerment of Yangtze finless porpoises. A study conducted on noise pollution in the Yangzte River suggested that the elevated levels of noise pollution altered the temporal hearing threshold of the finless porpoises and posed a significant threat to their survival.

Noise pollution may have caused the death of certain species of whales that beached themselves after being exposed to the loud sound of military sonar. (see also Marine mammals and sonar) Even marine invertebrates, such as crabs (Carcinus maenas), have been shown to be negatively affected by ship noise. Larger crabs were noted to be negatively affected more by the sounds than smaller crabs. Repeated exposure to the sounds did lead to acclimatization.

Why invertebrates are affected
Several reasons have been identified relating to hypersensitivity in invertebrates when exposed to anthropogenic noise. Invertebrates have evolved to pick up sound, and a large portion of their physiology is adapted for the purpose of detecting environmental vibrations. Antennae or hairs on the organism pick up particle motion. Anthropogenic noise created in the marine environment, such as pile driving and shipping, are picked up through particle motion; these activities exemplify near-field stimuli. 

The ability to detect vibration through mechanosensory structures is most important in invertebrates and fish. Mammals, also, depend on pressure detector ears to perceive the noise around them. Therefore, it is suggested that marine invertebrates are likely perceiving the effects of noise differently than marine mammals. It is reported that invertebrates can detect a large range of sounds, but noise sensitivity varies substantially between each species. Generally, however, invertebrates depend on frequencies under 10 kHz. This is the frequency at which a great deal of ocean noise occurs. 

Therefore, not only does anthropogenic noise often mask invertebrate communication, but it also negatively impacts other biological system functions through noise-induced stress.
Another one of the leading causes of noise effects in invertebrates is because sound is used in multiple behavioral contexts by many groups. This includes regularly sound produced or perceived in the context of aggression or predator avoidance. Invertebrates also utilize sound to attract or locate mates, and often employ sound in the courtship process.

Stress recorded in physiological and behavioral responses

Many of the studies that were conducted on invertebrate exposure to noise found that a physiological or behavioral response was triggered. Most of the time, this related to stress, and provided concrete evidence that marine invertebrates detect and respond to noise. Some of the most informative studies in this category focus on hermit crabs. In one study, it was found that the behavior of the hermit crab Pagurus bernhardus, when attempting to choose a shell, was modified when subjected to noise. 

Proper selection of hermit crab shells strongly contributes to their ability to survive. Shells offer protection against predators, high salinity and desiccation. However, researchers determined that approach to shell, investigation of shell, and habitation of shell, occurred over a shorter time duration with anthropogenic noise as a factor. This indicated that assessment and decision-making processes of the hermit crab were both altered, even though hermit crabs are not known to evaluate shells using any auditory or mechanoreception mechanisms. 

In another study that focused on Pagurus bernhardus and the blue mussel, (Mytilus edulis) physical behaviors exhibited a stress response to noise. When the hermit crab and mussel were exposed to different types of noise, significant variation in the valve gape occurred in the blue mussel. The hermit crab responded to the noise by lifting the shell off of the ground multiple times, then vacating the shell to examine it before returning inside. The results from the hermit crab trials were ambiguous with respect to causation; more studies must be conducted in order to determine whether the behavior of the hermit crab can be attributed to the noise produced.

Another study that demonstrates a stress response in invertebrates was conducted on the squid species Doryteuthis pealeii. The squid was exposed to sounds of construction known as pile driving, which impacts the sea bed directly and produces intense substrate-borne and water-borne vibrations. The squid reacted by jetting, inking, pattern change and other startle responses. Since the responses recorded are similar to those identified when faced with a predator, it is implied that the squid initially viewed the sounds as a threat. However, it was also noted that the alarm responses decreased over a period of time, signifying that the squid had likely acclimated to the noise. Regardless, it is apparent that stress occurred in the squid, and although further investigation has not been pursued, researchers suspect that other implications exist that may alter the squid's survival habits.

An additional study examined the impact noise exposure had on the Indo-Pacific humpbacked dolphin (Sousa chinensis). The dolphins were exposed to elevated noise levels due to construction in the Pearl River Estuary in China, specifically caused by the world's largest vibration hammer—the OCTA-KONG. The study suggested that while the dolphin's clicks were not affected, their whistles were because of susceptibility to auditory masking. The noise from the OCTA-KONG was found to have been detectable by the dolphins up to 3.5 km away from the original source, and while the noise was not found to be life-threatening it was indicated that prolonged exposure to this noise could be responsible for auditory damage.

Impacts on communication
Terrestrial anthropogenic noise affects the acoustic communications in grasshoppers while producing sound to attract a mate. The fitness and reproductive success of a grasshopper is dependent on its ability to attract a mating partner. Male Corthippus biguttulus grasshoppers attract females by using stridulation to produce courtship songs. The females produce acoustic signals that are shorter and primarily low frequency and amplitude, in response to the male's song. Research has found that this species of grasshopper changes its mating call in response to loud traffic noise. Lampe and Schmoll (2012) found that male grasshoppers from quiet habitats have a local frequency maximum of about 7319 Hz.

In contrast, male grasshoppers exposed to loud traffic noise can create signals with a higher local frequency maximum of 7622 Hz. The higher frequencies are produced by the grasshoppers to prevent background noise from drowning out their signals. This information reveals that anthropogenic noise disturbs the acoustic signals produced by insects for communication. Similar processes of behavior perturbation, behavioral plasticity, and population level shifts in response to noise likely occur in sound-producing marine invertebrates, but more experimental research is needed.

Impacts on development
Boat-noise has been shown to affect the embryonic development and fitness of the sea hare Stylocheilus striatus. Anthropogenic noise can alter conditions in the environment that have a negative effect on invertebrate survival. Although embryos can adapt to normal changes in their environment, evidence suggests they are not well adapted to endure the negative effects of noise pollution. Studies have been conducted on the sea hare to determine the effects of boat noise on the early stages of life and the development of embryos. Researchers have studied sea hares from the lagoon of Moorea Island, French Polynesia. In the study, recordings of boat noise were made by using a hydrophone. In addition, recordings of ambient noise were made that did not contain boat noise. In contrast to ambient noise playbacks, mollusks exposed to boat noise playbacks had a 21% reduction in embryonic development. Additionally, newly hatched larvae experienced an increased mortality rate of 22% when exposed to boat noise playbacks.

Impacts on ecosystem
Anthropogenic noise can have negative effects on invertebrates that aid in controlling environmental processes that are crucial to the ecosystem. There are a variety of natural underwater sounds produced by waves in coastal and shelf habitats, and biotic communication signals that do not negatively impact the ecosystem. The changes in behavior of invertebrates vary depending on the type of anthropogenic noise and is similar to natural noisescapes.

Experiments have examined the behavior and physiology of the clam (Ruditapes philippinarum), the decapod (Nephrops norvegicus), and the brittlestar (Amphiura filiformis) that are affected by sounds resembling shipping and building noises. The three invertebrates in the experiment were exposed to continuous broadband noise and impulsive broadband noise. The anthropogenic noise impeded the bioirrigation and burying behavior of Nephrops norvegicus. In addition, the decapod exhibited a reduction in movement. Ruditapes philippinarum experienced stress which caused a reduction in surface relocation. The anthropogenic noise caused the clams to close their valves and relocate to an area above the interface of the sediment-water. This response inhibits the clam from mixing the top layer of the sediment profile and hinders suspension feeding. Sound causes Amphiura filiformis to experience changes in physiological processes which results in irregularity of bioturbation behavior.

These invertebrates play an important role in transporting substances for benthic nutrient cycling. As a result, ecosystems are negatively impacted when species cannot perform natural behaviors in their environment. Locations with shipping lanes, dredging, or commercial harbors are known as continuous broadband sound. Pile-driving, and construction are sources that exhibit impulsive broadband noise. The different types of broadband noise have different effects on the varying species of invertebrates and how they behave in their environment.

Another study found that the valve closures in the Pacific oyster Magallana gigas was a behavioral response to varying degrees of acoustic amplitude levels and noise frequencies. Oysters perceive near-field sound vibrations by utilizing statocysts. In addition, they have superficial receptors that detect variations in water pressure. Sound pressure waves from shipping can be produced below 200Hz. Pile driving generates noise between 20 and 1000 Hz. In addition, large explosions can create frequencies ranging from 10 to 200Hz. M. gigas can detect these noise sources because their sensory system can detect sound in the 10 to < 1000Hz range.

The anthropogenic noise produced by human activity has been shown to negatively impact oysters. Studies have revealed that wide and relaxed valves are indicative of healthy oysters. The oysters are stressed when they do not open their valves as frequently in response to environmental noise. This provides support that the oysters detect noise at low acoustic energy levels. While we generally understand that marine noise pollution influences charismatic megafauna like whales and dolphins, understanding  how invertebrates like oysters perceive and respond to human generated sound can provide further insight about the effects of anthropogenic noise on the larger ecosystem. The aquatic ecosystems are known to use sound to navigate, find food, and protect themselves. In 2020, one of the worst mass stranding of whales occurred in Australia. Experts suggest that noise pollution plays a major role in the mass stranding of whales.

Noise assessment

Metrics of noise
Researchers measure noise in terms of pressure, intensity, and frequency. Sound pressure level (SPL) represents the amount of pressure relative to atmospheric pressure during sound wave propagation that can vary with time; this is also known as the sum of the amplitudes of a wave. Sound intensity, measured in Watts per meters-squared, represents the flow of sound over a particular area. Although sound pressure and intensity differ, both can describe the level of loudness by comparing the current state to the threshold of hearing; this results in decibel units on the logarithmic scale. The logarithmic scale accommodates the vast range of sound heard by the human ear. 

Frequency, or pitch, is measured in Hertz (Hz) and reflects the number of sound waves propagated through the air per second. The range of frequencies heard by the human ear range from 20 Hz to 20,000 Hz; however, sensitivity to hearing higher frequencies decreases with age. Some organisms, such as elephants, can register frequencies between 0 and 20 Hz (infrasound), and others, such as bats, can recognize frequencies above 20,000 Hz (ultrasound) to echolocate.

Researchers use different weights to account for noise frequency with intensity, as humans do not perceive sound at the same loudness level. The most commonly used weighted levels are A-weighting, C-weighting, and Z-weighting. A-weighting mirrors the range of hearing, with frequencies of 20 Hz to 20,000 Hz. This gives more weight to higher frequencies and less weight to lower frequencies. C-weighting has been used to measure peak sound pressure or impulse noise, similar to loud short-lived noises from machinery in occupational settings. Z-weighting, also known as zero-weighting, represents noise levels without any frequency weights.

Understanding sound pressure levels is key to assessing measurements of noise pollution. Several metrics describing noise exposure include:

 Energy average equivalent level of the A-weighted sound, LAeq: This measures the average sound energy over a given period for constant or continuous noise, such as road traffic. LAeq can be further broken up into different types of noise based on time of day; however, cutoffs for evening and nighttime hours may differ between countries, with the United States, Belgium, and New Zealand noting evening hours from 19:00-22:00 or 7:00pm–10:00pm and nighttime hours from 22:00-7:00 or 10:00pm–7:00am and most European countries noting evening hours from 19:00-23:00 or 7:00pm–11:00pm and nighttime hours from 23:00-7:00 or 11:00pm–7:00am). LAeq terms include:
 Day-night average level, DNL or LDN: This measurement assesses the cumulative exposure to sound for a 24-hour period (Leq over 24 hrs) of the year, with a 10 dB(A) penalty or weight added to nighttime noise measurements given the increased sensitivity to noise at night. This is calculated from the following equation (United States, Belgium, New Zealand):
Day-evening-night average level, DENL or Lden: This measurement, commonly used in European countries, assesses the 24 hour average in a year (similar to DNL); however, this measurement separates evening (4 hours, 19:00-23:00 or 7:00pm–11:00pm) from night hours (8 hours, 23:00-7:00 or 11:00pm–7:00am) and adds a 5 dB penalty to evening and 10 dB penalty to nighttime hours. This is calculated from the following equation (most of Europe):                                                                                             
Daytime level, LAeqD or Lday: This measurement assesses daytime noise, usually from 7:00-19:00 (7am-7pm), yet may vary by country.
Nighttime level, LAeqN or Lnight: This measurement assesses nighttime noise, depending on country cutoff hours discussed above.
Maximum level, LAmax: This measurement represents the maximal noise level when examining point sources or single events of noise; however, this value does not factor in duration of the event.
 Sound exposure level of A-weighted sound, SEL: This measurement represents the total energy for a particular event. SEL is used to describe discrete events in terms of A-weighted sound. The difference between SEL and LAmax is that SEL is derived using multiple time points of a particular event in calculating sound levels rather than the peak value.
Percentile-derived measurements (L10, L50, L90, etc.): Noise may be described in terms of its statistical distribution over a set time, in which investigators may obtain values, or cut-points, at any percentile level. The L90 is the sound level that exceeds 90% of the time period; this is commonly referred to as background noise.
Researchers with the US National Park Service found that human activity doubles the background-noise levels in 63 percent of protected spaces like national parks, and increases them tenfold in 21 percent. In the latter places, “if you could have heard something 100 feet away, now you can only hear it 10 feet away,”

Instrumentation

Sound level meters
Sound can be measured in the air using a sound level meter, a device consisting of a microphone, an amplifier, and a time meter. Sound level meters can measure noise at different frequencies (usually A- and C-weighted levels). There are two settings for response time constants, fast (time constant = 0.125 seconds, similar to human hearing) or slow (1 second, used for calculating averages over widely varying sound levels). Sound level meters meet the required standards set by the International Electrotechnical Commission (IEC) and in the United States, the American National Standards Institute as type 0, 1, or 2 instruments. 

Type 0 devices are not required to meet the same criteria expected of types 1 and 2 since scientists use these as laboratory reference standards. Type 1 (precision) instruments are to study the precision of capturing sound measurements, while type 2 instruments are for general field use. Type 1 devices acceptable by the standards have a margin of error of ±1.5 dB, while type 2 instruments meet a margin of error of ±2.3 dB.

Dosimeters
Sound can also be measured using a noise dosimeter, a device similar to a sound level meter. Individuals have used dosimeters to measure personal exposure levels in occupational settings given their smaller, more portable size. Unlike many sound level meters, a dosimeter microphone attaches to the worker and monitors levels throughout a work shift. Additionally, dosimeters can calculate the percent dose or time-weighted average (TWA).

Smartphone applications

In recent years, scientists and audio engineers have been developing smartphone apps to conduct sound measurements, similar to the standalone sound level meters and dosimeters. In 2014, the National Institute for Occupational Safety and Health (NIOSH) within the Centers for Disease Control and Prevention (CDC) published a study examining the efficacy of 192 sound measurement apps on Apple and Android smartphones. 

The authors found that only 10 apps, all of which were on the App Store, met all acceptability criteria. Of these 10 apps, only 4 apps met accuracy criteria within 2 dB(A) from the reference standard. As a result of this study, they created the NIOSH Sound Level Meter App to increase accessibility and decrease costs of monitoring noise using crowdsourcing data with a tested and highly accurate application. The app is compliant with ANSI S1.4 and IEC 61672 requirements.

The app calculates the following measures: total run time, instantaneous sound level, A-weighted equivalent sound level (LAeq), maximum level (LAmax), C-weighted peak sound level, time-weighted average (TWA), dose, and projected dose. Dose and projected dose are based on sound level and duration of noise exposure in relation to the NIOSH recommended exposure limit of 85 dB(A) for an eight-hour work shift. 

Using the phone's internal microphone (or an attached external microphone), the NIOSH Sound Level Meter measures instantaneous sound levels in realtime and converts sound into electrical energy to calculate measurements in A-, C-, or Z-weighted decibels. App users are able to generate, save, and e-mail measurement reports. The NIOSH Sound Level Meter is currently only available on Apple iOS devices.

Noise control

The Hierarchy of Controls concept is often used to reduce noise in the environment or the workplace. Engineering noise controls can be used to reduce noise propagation and protect individuals from overexposure. When noise controls are not feasible or adequate, individuals can also take steps to protect themselves from the harmful effects of noise pollution. If people must be around loud sounds, they can protect their ears with hearing protection (e.g., ear plugs or ear muffs). 

Buy Quiet programs and initiatives have arisen in an effort to combat occupational noise exposures. These programs promote the purchase of quieter tools and equipment and encourage manufacturers to design quieter equipment.

Noise from roadways and other urban factors can be mitigated by urban planning and better design of roads. Roadway noise can be reduced by the use of noise barriers, limitation of vehicle speeds, alteration of roadway surface texture, limitation of heavy vehicles, use of traffic controls that smooth vehicle flow to reduce braking and acceleration, and tire design. 

An important factor in applying these strategies is a computer model for roadway noise, that is capable of addressing local topography, meteorology, traffic operations, and hypothetical mitigation. Costs of building-in mitigation can be modest, provided these solutions are sought in the planning stage of a roadway project.

Aircraft noise can be reduced by using quieter jet engines. Altering flight paths and time of day runway has benefited residents near airports.

Legal status and regulation

Country-specific regulations
Up until the 1970s governments tended to view noise as a "nuisance" rather than an environmental problem.

Many conflicts over noise pollution are handled by negotiation between the emitter and the receiver. Escalation procedures vary by country, and may include action in conjunction with local authorities, in particular the police.

Egypt
In 2007, the Egyptian National Research Center found that the average noise level in central Cairo was 90 decibels and that the noise never fell below 70 decibels. Noise limits set by law in 1994 are not enforced. In 2018, the World Hearing Index declared Cairo to be the world's second-noisiest city.

India
Noise pollution is a major problem in India. The government of India has rules and regulations against firecrackers and loudspeakers, but enforcement is extremely lax. Awaaz Foundation is a non-governmental organization in India working to control noise pollution from various sources through advocacy, public interest litigation, awareness, and educational campaigns since 2003.  Despite increased enforcement and stringency of laws now being practiced in urban areas, rural areas are still affected.

The Supreme Court of India had banned playing of music on loudspeakers after 10pm. In 2015, The National Green Tribunal directed authorities in Delhi to ensure strict adherence to guidelines on noise pollution, saying noise is more than just a nuisance as it can produce serious psychological stress. However, implementation of the law remains poor.

Sweden
How noise emissions should be reduced, without the industry being hit too hard, is a major problem in environmental care in Sweden today. The Swedish Work Environment Authority has set an input value of 80 dB for maximum sound exposure for eight hours. In workplaces where there is a need to be able to converse comfortably the background noise level should not exceed 40 dB. The government of Sweden has taken soundproofing and acoustic absorbing actions, such as noise barriers and active noise control.

United Kingdom
Figures compiled by rockwool, the mineral wool insulation manufacturer, based on responses from local authorities to a Freedom of Information Act (FOI) request reveal in the period April 2008 – 2009 UK councils received 315,838 complaints about noise pollution from private residences. This resulted in environmental health officers across the UK serving 8,069 noise abatement notices or citations under the terms of the Anti-Social Behavior (Scotland) Act. In the last 12 months, 524 confiscations of equipment have been authorized involving the removal of powerful speakers, stereos and televisions. Westminster City Council has received more complaints per head of population than any other district in the UK with 9,814 grievances about noise, which equates to 42.32 complaints per thousand residents. Eight of the top 10 councils ranked by complaints per 1,000 residents are located in London.

United States
The Noise Control Act of 1972 established a U.S. national policy to promote an environment for all Americans free from noise that jeopardizes their health and welfare. In the past, Environmental Protection Agency coordinated all federal noise control activities through its Office of Noise Abatement and Control. The EPA phased out the office's funding in 1982 as part of a shift in federal noise control policy to transfer the primary responsibility of regulating noise to state and local governments. However, the Noise Control Act of 1972 and the Quiet Communities Act of 1978 were never rescinded by Congress and remain in effect today, although essentially unfunded.

The National Institute for Occupational Safety and Health (NIOSH) at the Centers for Disease Control and Prevention (CDC) researches noise exposure in occupational settings and recommends a Recommended Exposure Limit (REL) for an 8-hour time-weighted average (TWA) or work shift of 85 dB(A) and for impulse noise (instant events such as bangs or crashes) of 140 dB(A). The agency published this recommendation along with its origin, noise measurement devices, hearing loss prevention programs, and research needs in 1972 (later revised June 1998) as an approach in preventing occupational noise-related hearing loss.

The Occupational Safety and Health Administration (OSHA) within the Department of Labor issues enforceable standards to protect workers from occupational noise hazards. The permissible exposure limit (PEL) for noise is a TWA of 90 dB(A) for an eight-hour work day. However, in manufacturing and service industries, if the TWA is greater than 85 dB(A), employers must implement a Hearing Conservation Program.

The Federal Aviation Administration (FAA) regulates aircraft noise by specifying the maximum noise level that individual civil aircraft can emit through requiring aircraft to meet certain noise certification standards. These standards designate changes in maximum noise level requirements by "stage" designation. The U.S. noise standards are defined in the Code of Federal Regulations (CFR) Title 14 Part 36 – Noise Standards: Aircraft Type and Airworthiness Certification (14 CFR Part 36). The FAA also pursues a program of aircraft noise control in cooperation with the aviation community. The FAA has set up a process to report  for anyone who may be impacted by aircraft noise.

The Federal Highway Administration (FHWA) developed noise regulations to control highway noise as required by the Federal-Aid Highway Act of 1970. The regulations requires promulgation of traffic noise-level criteria for various land use activities, and describe procedures for the abatement of highway traffic noise and construction noise.

The Department of Housing and Urban Development (HUD) noise standards as described in 24 CFR part 51, Subpart B provides minimum national standards applicable to HUD programs to protect citizen against excessive noise in their communities and places of residence. For instance, all sites whose environmental or community noise exposure exceeds the day night average sound level (DNL) of 65 (dB) are considered noise-impacted areas, it defines "Normally Unacceptable" noise zones where community noise levels are between 65 and 75 dB, for such locations, noise abatement and noise attenuation features must be implemented. Locations where the DNL is above 75 dB are considered "Unacceptable" and require approval by the Assistant Secretary for Community Planning and Development.

The map aims to assist city planners, elected officials, scholars, and residents to gain access to up-to-date aviation and Interstate highway noise information.

States and local governments typically have very specific statutes on building codes, urban planning, and roadway development. Noise laws and ordinances vary widely among municipalities and indeed do not even exist in some cities. An ordinance may contain a general prohibition against making noise that is a nuisance, or it may set out specific guidelines for the level of noise allowable at certain times of the day and for certain activities. Noise laws classify sound into three categories. First is ambient noise, which refers to sound pressure of all-encompassing noise associated with a given environment. The second is continuous noise, which could be steady or fluctuating, but continues for more than an hour. The third is cyclically varying noise, which could be steady or fluctuating, but occurs repetitively at reasonably uniform intervals of time.

New York City instituted the first comprehensive noise code in 1985. The Portland Noise Code includes potential fines of up to $5000 per infraction and is the basis for other major U.S. and Canadian city noise ordinances.<ref>{{cite web | work = Auditor's Office | publisher = City of Portland, Oregon | url = http://www.portlandonline.com/auditor/index.cfm?c=28705 | title = Chapter 18.02 Title Noise Control | access-date = April 20, 2009 | archive-date = July 15, 2011 | archive-url = https://web.archive.org/web/20110715110053/http://www.portlandonline.com/auditor/index.cfm?c=28705 | url-status = live }}</ref>

World Health Organization

European Region
In 1995, the World Health Organization (WHO) European Region released guidelines on regulating community noise. The WHO European Region subsequently released other versions of the guidelines, with the most recent version circulated in 2018. The guidelines provide the most up-to-date evidence from research conducted in Europe and other parts of the world on non-occupational noise exposure and its relationship to physical and mental health outcomes. The guidelines provide recommendations for limits and preventive  measures regarding various noise sources (road traffic, railway, aircraft, wind turbine) for day-evening-night average and nighttime average levels. Recommendations for leisure noise in 2018 were conditional and based on the equivalent sound pressure level during an average 24-hour period in a year without weights for nighttime noise (LAeq, 24 hrs); WHO set the recommended limit to 70 dB(A).

 See also 

Acoustical engineering
Aircraft noise pollution
Buy Quiet
Environmental hazard
Environmental noise
Health effects from noise
International Noise Awareness Day
Light pollution
Loud music
Loudspeakers in mosques
NIMBY
Noise Abatement Society
Noise and vibration on maritime vessels
Noise calculation
Noise control
Noise measurement
Noise map
Noise regulation
Occupational noise
Safe listening
World Hearing Day

 References 

Bibliography
  

 External links 

Noise Pollution Clearinghouse
Noise effects. Beyond annoyance
 
 World Health Organization – Guidelines for Community Noise
 The effects of noisy urban environment may cause the loss of memory to elderly person (abstract published in 1st World Congress of Health and Urban Environment book.)
 Clive Thompson on How Man-Made Noise May Be Altering Earth's Ecology
 EEA draws the first map of Europe's noise exposure – All press releases — EEA
Scientific American: How does background noise affect our concentration? (2010-01-04)
Noise-Planet: app  to make an open source noise map of environmental noise
Noise Pollution Hurts Animals. Here's How to Turn The Volume Down. ScienceAlert''. August 23, 2022.

 
Pollution
Audiology
Sounds by type
Urbanization
Urban planning
Acoustics